Reynold Carrington is a former Trinbagonian international footballer and current football manager for Point Fortin Civic. He played as deep-lying midfield playmaker or as a sweeper.

Playing career

Carrington enjoyed most of his career at Trinidad and Tobago, with brief spells at the United States and Indonesia. He returned to Trinidad & Tobago in 1999 to play for his hometown club Point Fortin Civic and was sold in the same year to newcomers W Connection with Wesley Webb and David Atiba Charles for TT$75,000. In 2000, he won the Player of the Year award for W Connection, TT Pro League and TTFA.

He was named in the team for the 2001 Caribbean Cup, winning the title and scoring in the first match against Barbados and the 2002 CONCACAF Gold Cup. He made his international debut for Trinidad and Tobago in 1992, playing his last match for the Soca Warrions in 2003.

Coaching career

His first coaching experience was in 2003 as a player-manager for W Connection after team manager Stuart Charles-Fevrier was in charge of the national team. He was named assistant manager after retirement.

He was put in charge of the Trinidad and Tobago national under-15 football team in 2007, also coaching the under-17 team later. In 2012, he took charge of his native city club Point Fortin Civic, leaving the club in early 2015 claiming lack of motivation of his players.

Personal life

He is the father of Khadeen Carrington, who played college basketball for the Seton Hall Pirates and now professionally in Germany and the stepfather of footballer Kariym Balthazar, whom he coached and Point Fortin Civic.

International goals

Honours
 Defence Force
 National League Winner: 1989, 1990, 1992, 1993, 1995

 W Connection
 TT Pro League Winner: 2000, 2001, 2005
 TT Pro League Runner-up: 2002, 2003–04

Trinidad and Tobago
 Caribbean Cup Winner: 2001

References

1970 births
2002 CONCACAF Gold Cup players
Living people
Trinidad and Tobago international footballers
Trinidad and Tobago footballers
Association football sweepers
Association football midfielders